Yellowwood may refer to:

Plants
 Afrocarpus spp., a genus of conifers native to Africa, Afrocarpus falcatus (Syn.: Podocarpus falcatus), common, smooth-barked, bastard, small-leaved yellowwood, Afrocarpus gracilior (Syn.: Podocarpus gracilior), East African yellowwood, Outeniqua yellowwood
 Annickia spp., African yellowwood
 Alstonia spectabilis, milky yellowwood
 Berberis vulgaris
 Cassine crocea, yellowwood, saffron wood
 Cladrastis spp., a genus of trees in the family Fabaceae
 Cladrastis kentukea spp., a tree indigenous to the south eastern United States, American, Kentucky yellowwood
 Cladrastis delavayi (Syn.: Cladrastis sinensis), Chinese yellowwood
 Coprosma linariifolia, a shrub or small tree of New Zealand
 Cornus sericea (Syn.: Cornus stolonifera)
 Cotinus coggygri (Syn.: Rhus cotinus)
 Euxylophora paraensis, Brazilian yellowwood, yellowheart
 Flindersia xanthoxyla, a tall rainforest tree from Australia in the family Rutaceae
 Frangula alnus, Frangula caroliniana
 Maackia amurensis, Chinese yellowwood 
 Maclura pomifera, a fruit in the family Moraceae
 Ochrosia, a genus in the family Apocynacaeae native to southeastern Asia, Australia, and the Pacific
 Podocarpus spp., a genus of conifers of the family Podocarpaceae, Breede River yellowwood, Podocarpus henkelii, Henkel's, Falcate, Drankensberg, Natal, long-leaved, (East) Griqualand yellowwood, Podocarpus guatemalensis, British Honduras yellowwood, Podocarpus latifolius, real, true, broad-leaved, upright yellowwood
 Rhodosphaera spp., Rhodosphaera rhodanthema, deep yellowwood
 Rhus coriaria
 Sarcomelicope simplicifolia (big yellowwood), a small rainforest tree from Australia in the family Rutaceae 
 Zanthoxylum spp., Zanthoxylum americanum, a shrub of North America, little yellowwood Zanthoxylum ovalifolium and for thorny yellowwood, Zanthoxylum pinnatum, Zanthoxylum brachyacanthum or Zanthoxylum piperitum etc.

Other
 Yellowwood Park
 Yellowwood State Forest, a state forest in Brown County, Indiana